Jamie White (born 9 October 1992), better known by the ring name Jay White (ジェイ・ホワイト Jei Howaito), is a New Zealand professional wrestler. He is best known for his tenure with New Japan Pro-Wrestling (NJPW). After starting his career in 2013, White joined NJPW the following year as a Young Lion. In June 2016, White left for an overseas excursion, during which he worked for the American Ring of Honor (ROH) and the British Revolution Pro Wrestling (RPW) promotions through NJPW's international partnerships.

White eventually returned to NJPW in November 2017 and won the IWGP United States Heavyweight Championship the following January. Later in 2018, he betrayed his fellow Chaos stablemates to join Bullet Club, eventually becoming the group's fourth leader. White is also a former IWGP Heavyweight Champion, IWGP Intercontinental Champion, and NEVER Openweight Champion, making him the fifth NJPW Triple Crown Champion and the first NJPW Grand Slam Champion. In 2022, White also captured the IWGP World Heavyweight Championship.

Professional wrestling career

Early career (2013–2014)
White initially trained under The UK Kid at Varsity Pro Wrestling in early 2013, and made his professional debut on 19 February, working for VPW as well as All Star Wrestling, among other promotions. In an interview on Chris Jericho's podcast, White acknowledged that he was able to train in the UK because he held a Dutch passport. Being a citizen of the Netherlands allowed him access to the UK, which was a part of the EU at the time. In early 2014, White met New Japan Pro-Wrestling (NJPW)'s Prince Devitt and competed alongside him in a tag team match for VPW. After the match, Devitt gave White his card and told him to keep in touch.

Shortly thereafter, White was contacted by Bad Luck Fale, who said that Devitt had spoken to NJPW officials about White and that he could get him a place as a young lion in the dojo if he wanted it.

Several months later, White met with Fale, Devitt, and Shinsuke Nakamura in London, where White accepted their offer and began finalizing his visa to leave for the NJPW Dojo.

New Japan Pro-Wrestling (2015–2016)
White left for Japan on New Year's Eve 2015, began further training as a young lion upon his arrival, and made his debut for NJPW on 30 January 2015, losing to Alex Shelley. White lost all but eight of his matches in 2015, as is common for young lions in NJPW. In 2016, White began gaining more victories, and on 27 March competed in his biggest match to date when he was defeated by then-reigning IWGP Intercontinental Champion Kenny Omega in a non-title match. White's final match in NJPW took place on 19 June 2016 at Dominion 6.19 in Osaka-jo Hall, when he, David Finlay, and Juice Robinson were defeated by Satoshi Kojima, Hiroyoshi Tenzan, and Manabu Nakanishi. White left for his excursion to the United States the following week.

Ring of Honor (2016–2017)

Upon moving to the United States, White was first based in New Jersey, before moving to Detroit, where he lived with Alex Shelley. White debuted in Ring of Honor (ROH) at the 25 June TV tapings, defeating Kamaitachi. He teamed with The Motor City Machine Guns (Alex Shelley and Chris Sabin) to defeat Kamaitachi and The Addiction (Christopher Daniels and Frankie Kazarian). White and The Motor City Machine Guns eventually formed a stable named "Search and Destroy" with Jonathan Gresham and Lio Rush. On 8 July, White defeated Lio Rush. At the next set of TV tapings, White defeated Will Ferrara and wrestled Jay Briscoe to a time limit draw.

On 19 August, White competed in a fatal four way match against Kamaitachi, Lio Rush, and Donovan Dijak, which was won by Dijak. The following day, White and Rush were defeated by The Briscoe Brothers. On 30 September, White teamed with Kushida and A. C. H. to defeat The Briscoes and Toru Yano in a quarter final match in the ROH Trios Tag Team Championship Tournament. White, ACH, and Kushida then defeated The Cabinet (Rhett Titus, Kenny King, and Caprice Coleman) in the semi-finals, but were defeated by The Kingdom (Matt Taven, Vinny Marseglia, and T. K. O'Ryan) in the final at Final Battle.

On 6 June, White received his biggest title opportunity in his career at the time when after winning a Battle Royal he unsuccessfully challenged Christopher Daniels for The ROH World Championship in a triple threat match. At Best in the World 2017 White, teaming with Search and Destroy defeated The Rebellion in a losers must disband match thus keeping the group together.

Revolution Pro Wrestling (2016–2017) 
White debuted for England's Revolution Pro Wrestling on 12 August 2016, defeating Josh Bodom. He returned on 26 August, defeating Mark Haskins. White competed once again for RPW on 21 January 2017, defeating Martin Stone.

Return to NJPW

Chaos (2017–2018)
On 5 November 2017, at Power Struggle, White returned to NJPW as the mysterious "Switchblade.” He had been teased for the past several months, challenging Hiroshi Tanahashi to a match for the IWGP Intercontinental Championship at Wrestle Kingdom 12 in Tokyo Dome, before attacking him. The following day, NJPW officially announced the match between Tanahashi and White for Wrestle Kingdom 12. On 4 January, White was defeated by Tanahashi in the title match.

On 5 January, Jay teased joining Bullet Club; however, White then betrayed Kenny Omega by attacking him with a Blade Runner. A day later, he joined the Chaos faction in order to face off against Bullet Club and Kenny Omega, claiming he needed backup in his fight against Bullet Club. On 28 January at The New Beginning in Sapporo, White defeated Omega to become the second IWGP United States Heavyweight Champion in the title's history. On 25 March, he went on to defend the title for the first time against Hangman Page at NJPW Strong Style Evolved Event in Long Beach, California. White would make his second successful title defence against David Finlay at Road to Dontaku. White would make his third defense of the title beating Punishment Martinez on night 2 of the ROH/NJPW War of the Worlds Tour in May.

At Dominion 6.9 in Osaka-jo Hall, White was pinned in a tag team match by Juice Robinson. Because of this, White defended and lost the title to Juice at the G1 Special in San Francisco, ending his reign at 160 days and three successful title defenses. White then competed in 2018 G1 Climax, where he competed in the A Block, where he ended with 12 points (six wins and three losses). In the tournament, he scored major wins over the leader of Chaos, Kazuchika Okada, as well as eventual winner Hiroshi Tanahashi, notably being the only person to defeat Tanahashi in the tournament.

Bullet Club leader (2018–2023)

At Destruction, White attacked Tanahashi after his defense of his G1 briefcase. He then attacked Okada, and Okada's former manager Gedo ran out to apparently save Okada. However, he turned on him by hitting him with a chair, and aligning himself with White. On 8 October, at King Of Pro Wrestling, White was defeated by Hiroshi Tanahashi. After the match, he and Gedo attacked Tanahashi, only for Okada to stop it. They were soon joined by Jado and Bullet Club OG in what turned out to be a setup to attack Okada, with White, Gedo and Jado all completing their defection from Chaos to join Bullet Club, becoming the new leader of the faction. At Wrestle Kingdom 13 on 4 January 2019, White defeated Okada.

At New Year Dash!!, White would defeat Tanahashi in a 6-Man Tag match and would challenge Tanahashi for his newly won IWGP Heavyweight Championship at The New Beginning in Osaka. At the event, he defeated Tanahashi to win his first world title. At the NJPW Anniversary Event in March, White defeated NEVER Openweight Champion Will Ospreay in a non-title champion vs. champion match. At the G1 Supercard on 6 April, Okada defeated White for the IWGP Heavyweight Championship, ending his reign at 54 days and no successful title defenses. White then entered the 2019 G1 Climax, competing in the B Block. Despite losing his first three matches against Hirooki Goto, Tomohiro Ishii and Toru Yano, White would make a comeback and win his next five matches against Jeff Cobb, Shingo Takagi, Taichi, Jon Moxley (being the first person to beat Moxley by pinfall) and Juice Robinson. He would then defeat Tetsuya Naito to win the B Block and advance to the tournament finals. However, he would be unsuccessful in winning the tournament after losing to A Block winner Kota Ibushi, finishing with an overall record of 12 points (six wins and three losses). In the main event of Destruction in Kobe on 22 September, White defeated Naito to win the IWGP Intercontinental Championship for the first time in his career in the main event. At Power Struggle on 3 November, White successfully defended the Intercontinental Championship against Hirooki Goto. However, he lost the championship back to Naito at Wrestle Kingdom 14 on 4 January 2020, ending his reign at 104 days. He followed this with a victory over Kota Ibushi the next day he then defeated Sanada at The New Beginning in Osaka on 9 February.

After an absence due to the COVID-19 pandemic, White returned on the 21 August episode of Strong, teaming with Bullet Club partner Chase Owens in a loss to Villain Enterprises (Brody King and Flip Gordon). He then participated in the 2020 G1 Climax in the A Block, which he ended with 12 points (six wins and three losses). At Power Struggle, White defeated Kota Ibushi to become the first wrestler to win the Tokyo Dome IWGP Heavyweight and Intercontinental Championships challenge rights certificate from the G1 Climax winner.

At Wrestle Kingdom 15, White lost to Ibushi, who had won the IWGP Heavyweight and Intercontinental Championships from previous champion Tetsuya Naito. During a press conference with the company on 5 January, White expressed his desire to quit NJPW after New Year Dash!!, stating that he was "as close to death as he had ever been, and he would hopefully ever be." At New Year's Dash the following day, White participated in a ten-tag team match with Bullet Club teammates Bad Luck Fale, Chase Owens, Evil, and Yujiro Takahashi, against Chaos members Yoshi-Hashi, Tomohiro Ishii, Kazuchika Okada, Hirooki Goto and Toru Yano, which they lost after Ishii pinned White. After a month long hiatus, White returned on February 1 on the Road to the New Beginning show, attacking Ishii and continuing their feud. At Castle Attack on 27 February, White defeated Ishii. White went on to feud with Hiroshi Tanahashi, from whom he won the NEVER Openweight Championship at Wrestling Dontaku 2021, making White the fifth man to win the New Japan Triple Crown and the first New Japan Grand Slam champion. On November 13, 2021 at Battle in the Valley Jay White lost the NEVER Openweight Championship to Tomohiro Ishii ending his reign at 195 days with 1 successful defense 

White returned to Japan on May 1, at Wrestling Dontaku, attacking reigning IWGP World Heavyweight Champion Kazuchika Okada after his match against Tetsuya Naito, challenging Okada to a match. At Dominion 6.12 in Osaka-jo Hall, White defeated Okada to win the World Championship for the first time. After the match, White celebrated with the rest of Bullet Club and demanded respect for him being the "creator" of All Elite Wrestling, referring to him beating AEW Vice President Kenny Omega for the IWGP United States Heavyweight Championship at The New Beginning in Sapporo which was near the end of Omega's tenure with NJPW before joining AEW. He also insulted "Hangman" Adam Page, who had called out former champion Okada on Dynamite earlier that week, teasing confrontation leading up to AEW×NJPW: Forbidden Door. Also at the event, White was announced to be a part of the G1 Climax 32 tournament in July, where he would compete in the B Block. Initially, White went undefeated for 5 straight matches, however a loss to former Bullet Club stablemate Tama Tonga on the block finals day, caused White to be eliminated from the tournament, finishing with 10 points and failing to advance to the semi-finals. This result led to Tonga receiving a shot at the IWGP World Heavyweight title on October 10th at Declaration of Power, though at the event White retained the championship. At Wrestle Kingdom 17 on January 4, 2023 at the Tokyo Dome, White lost the IWGP World Heavyweight Championship back to Okada, ending his reign at 206 days. 

In a post-match press conference, White accepted his loss, although he blamed it on former Bullet club stablemate Hikuleo, who had attacked White and left the stable in September. This led to White challenging Hikuleo to a "Loser Leaves Japan Match", which took place on February 11, where Hikuleo defeated White, forcing White to leave Japan. White was scheduled to compete against Eddie Kingston at the Battle in the Valley Event on February 18. White has claimed that if he won this match, Gedo will join him in the United States and that he will wrestle for New Japan in the United States going forward. This Match would later be changed to a Loser Leaves New Japan Match after a heated exchange between the White and Kingston on Wrestling Observer Live. At Battle In The Valley, White was defeated by Kingston thus forcing him to leave New Japan Pro Wrestling. After the match, White was attacked by David Finlay.

Impact Wrestling (2021–2022)
Through NJPW's affiliation with Impact Wrestling, White made his unannounced debut for Impact at the end of the Slammiversary event on July 17, 2021, confronting former Bullet Club leader Kenny Omega, Don Callis and former Bullet Club members Doc Gallows and Karl Anderson. Callis, Gallows and Anderson attempted to 'too sweet' White but the group was attacked by Sami Callihan, Juice Robinson and future NEVER Openweight Championship contender David Finlay, after which White hit Finlay with a bladerunner.

The following week, White confronted Gallows and Anderson, which ended in the two beating down White, until Chris Bey, who White attempted to recruit to Bullet Club following Slammiversary, made the save. On the July 29 episode of Impact, White and Bey lost to Gallows and Anderson. On the next week's episode of Impact, White accompanied Bey to his match against Juice Robinson, which Bey would win. After the match, White would hand Bey a Bullet Club shirt, officially welcoming Bey into the group.On the August 12 episode of Impact, Bullet Club (White and Bey) lost to FinJuice (David Finlay and Juice Robinson) by disqualification. on the February 3, 2022 episode of Impact, Bullet Club (Chris Bey, Jay White, Tama Tonga and Tanga Loa) defeated Ace Austin, Jake Something, Madman Fulton and Mike Bailey. At No Surrender (2022), White defeated Eric Young.

on the April 24, 2022 episode of Impact, White returned to Impact and teamed with Chris Bey to defeat Rich Swann and Willie Mack. At Under Siege (2022), Bullet Club (White, Chris Bey, Doc Gallows, El Phantasmo, and Karl Anderson) lost to Honor No More (Eddie Edwards, Kenny King, Matt Taven, Mike Bennett, and Vincent) in a ten match tag team match. On the May 12 episode of Impact, White and El Phantasmo lost to Josh Alexander and Tomohiro Ishii. On the June 16 episode of Impact, White and Chris Bey lost to The Briscoes (Jay Briscoe and Mark Briscoe).

All Elite Wrestling (2022)
White appeared in AEW on the February 9, 2022, episode of Dynamite, aiding Adam Cole and The Young Bucks in beating down Trent Beretta and Rocky Romero. After a match between The Young Bucks and Roppongi Vice on the February 11 episode of Rampage, White attacked Beretta again, setting up a match between the two on following week's episode, which White won by pinfall, after hitting Beretta with the Bladerunner.

White returned on the April 20 episode of Dynamite, alongside Cole, interrupting Tony Khan and Takami Ohbari's announcement of AEW×NJPW: Forbidden Door on June 26, claiming the event would be "all about" The Undisputed Elite and the Bullet Club. White once again returned to AEW on the June 15th special Road Rager edition of Dynamite along with his newly won IWGP World Heavyweight Championship,where with a distraction from Cole, he attacked "Hangman" Adam Page from behind with a   Bladerunner. He announced that he would not defend the World Championship against Page, before refusing to defend the title against Cole as well, much to the latter's dismay. White appeared on the June 22 edition of Dynamite interrupting Cole and Page once more. White and Cole beat down Page, only for Kazuchika Okada to make his AEW debut, attacking White and Cole. Soon after a four-way match between White, Page, Cole and Okada for White's IWGP World Heavyweight Championship was announced for Forbidden Door. At the event, White successfully retained his championship.

Personal life 
On 6 May 2022, White married longtime girlfriend Savanna Price. He holds both New Zealand and Dutch citizenship, with his grandfather being born in the Netherlands. His training and temporary residence in the United Kingdom is attributed to his Dutch passport, which allowed him to travel in Europe extensively.

Championships and accomplishments

New Japan Pro-Wrestling
IWGP World Heavyweight Championship (1 time)
IWGP Heavyweight Championship (1 time)
IWGP Intercontinental Championship (1 time)
NEVER Openweight Championship (1 time)
IWGP United States Heavyweight Championship (1 time)
 Fifth NJPW Triple Crown Champion
 First NJPW Grand Slam Champion 
Pro Wrestling Illustrated
Ranked No. 12 of the top 500 singles wrestlers in the PWI 500 in 2019

References

External links 

1992 births
21st-century professional wrestlers
Bullet Club members
Chaos (professional wrestling) members
Expatriate professional wrestlers in Japan
IWGP Heavyweight champions
IWGP Intercontinental champions
IWGP United States Champions
IWGP World Heavyweight champions
NEVER Openweight champions
Living people
New Zealand expatriate sportspeople in Japan
New Zealand expatriate sportspeople in the United States
New Zealand male professional wrestlers
New Zealand people of Dutch descent
Sportspeople from Auckland